Elsinoë fawcettii is a species of fungus in the Elsinoaceae family. It is a plant pathogen that causes citrus scab.

References 

Fungi described in 1936
Fungal citrus diseases
Elsinoë